Volker Engel (born 17 February 1965) is a German special effects artist who is best known as one of the people who won at the 69th Academy Awards for Best Visual Effects on the film Independence Day. He won with Douglas Smith, Clay Pinney and Joe Viskocil.

Selected filmography

White House Down (2013)
Hugo (2011)
2012 (2009)
Godzilla (1998)
Independence Day (1996)

See also

List of German-speaking Academy Award winners and nominees

References

External links

Living people
1965 births
People from Bremerhaven
Best Visual Effects Academy Award winners
Special effects people